MuchTemp or MuchBrass is an annual contest held across the nation of Canada by MuchMusic. The successful candidate gets an exclusive 2-month summer work experience to learn about all aspects of TV production. Over the years, the Temp contest has evolved into a nationally recognized and highly coveted annual summertime job opportunity.

One of the longest-tenured Muchmusic VJ's ever, Rick Campanelli, was a product of MuchTemp, and was often referred to as simply Temp or Rick The Temp, in reference to the contest.

Much (TV channel)